Goodfellow is a surname with English, Scottish or Irish origins. Notable people with the surname include:

Benjamin Goodfellow (1864–1946), British solicitor and philatelist
Bill Goodfellow, Canadian Minister of Highways in the Ontario Department of Highways, 1961–1962
Brent H. Goodfellow (born 1940), American politician
Charles Augustus Goodfellow (1836–1915), English recipient of the Victoria Cross
Daniel Goodfellow (born 1996), British diver
Douglas Goodfellow (1917–2014), New Zealand businessman and philanthropist
Ebbie Goodfellow (1906–1985), Canadian professional ice hockey player
Elizabeth Goodfellow (c.1767–1851), American cooking instructor
Fred Goodfellow (father of Herbert Goodfellow) (–1925), rugby union and rugby league footballer who played in the 1890s through to the 1920s
Frederick Goodfellow (1874–1960), British tug of war competitor
Geoff Goodfellow (born 1956 California), American inventor of the wireless communicator that became the Blackberry
George Goodfellow (cricketer) (1858–1892), Australian cricketer
George E. Goodfellow (1855-1910), American physician and expert on gunshot wounds
Gerald Goodfellow, U.S. Air Force brigadier general
Herbert Goodfellow (son of Fred Goodfellow) (1916-1997), English rugby league footballer who played in the 1930s, 1940s and 1950s
Ian Goodfellow, American computer scientist, engineer, and researcher
James Goodfellow (born 1937), Scottish inventor
Jimmy Goodfellow (born 1943), former English professional footballer and manager
Jimmy Goodfellow (footballer, born 1938) (1938–2011), Scottish footballer
Joan Goodfellow (born 1950), American actress 
Dame Julia Goodfellow (born 1951), British biophysicist and academic administrator
Kate Goodfellow (born 1989), Canadian rower
Marc Goodfellow (born 1981), English professional football player
Michael Goodfellow (born 1941), English actinobacterial systematician
Michael Goodfellow (curler) (born 1988), Scottish curler
Mike Goodfellow (1866–1920), American baseball player
Peter Goodfellow (geneticist) (born 1951), British geneticist 
Peter Goodfellow (politician), New Zealand businessman and politician
Ryan Goodfellow (born 1993), Scottish footballer 
Syd Goodfellow (1915 – 1998), English footballer
Walter Goodfellow (1866-1953), British zoological collector
William Goodfellow (executive) (born 1947), American, founding member and Executive director of the Center for International Policy
William Goodfellow (philanthropist) (1880–1974), New Zealand philanthropist
Dr Rob Goodfellow (1960–), Canadian-Australian book writer.

Fictional characters
Puck (Shakespeare), whose proper name is Robin Goodfellow
Dr Goodfellow, a fictional character on the television series Buck Rogers in the 25th Century
Sgt Goodfellow, a fictional character on the television series Father Brown
Gordon Goodfellow, character in The Ickabog
Robyn Goodfellowe and her father Bill Goodfellowe, characters in the animated film Wolfwalkers

References